Social CRM (customer relationship management) is use of social media services, techniques and technology to enable organizations to engage with their customers.

Applications
Social CRM has applications in marketing, customer service and sales, including:
 Social engagement with prospects: Social CRM tools allow businesses to better engage with their customers by, for example, listening to sentiments about their products and services.
Social customer service: Ownership of social media is shifting away from Marketing and Communication as engagement increasingly relates to inbound customer service-based topics. Rather than social being seen purely as a space for companies to deliver outbound marketing messages, it is the inbound customer queries that allow for meaningful points of engagement and the building of brand advocacy.
Personalized marketing strategy: The ability to create custom content is increasingly dependent on access to reliable, qualitative social user data to facilitate precise audience segmentation. Furthermore, dynamic audience segments, built on both social data and demographic data, allow for more accurate measurement of campaign KPIs.

Traditional CRM
Traditional customer relationship management focuses on collecting and managing static customer data, such as past purchase information, contact history and customer demographics. This information is often sourced from email and phone interactions, commonly limited to direct interactions between the company and the customer.

Social CRM adds a deeper layer of information onto traditional CRM by adding data derived from social networks like Facebook, Twitter, LinkedIn or any other social network where a user publicly shares information. The key benefit of social CRM is the ability for companies to interact with customers in a multichannel retailing environment (commonly referred to as omnichannel) and talk to customers the way they talk to each other. Social CRM enables companies to track a customer's social influence and source data from conversations occurring outside of formal, direct communication. Social CRM also allows companies to keep a full audit history of all customer interactions, regardless of social channel they choose to use, available to all customer care employees.

Social CRM metrics in applications 
Metrics for building awareness:
 web traffic
 search volume trends
 volume of followers
 social mentions 
Metrics for increasing sales:  
 website traffic
 social mentions
 volume of followers
 repeat visits 
 social content acceptance rate
Metrics for assessing  changes environment in an industry: 
 Share of Voice: how much of the overall voice a single brand consumes.

See also
 Customer experience management
 Natural language processing
 Sentiment analysis
 Social analytics
 Social Selling
 Text analytics
 Text mining
 Unstructured data
 Voice of the customer

References

Customer relationship management